The San Luis Reservoir is an artificial lake on San Luis Creek in the eastern slopes of the Diablo Range of Merced County, California, approximately  west of Los Banos on State Route 152, which crosses Pacheco Pass and runs along its north shore. It is the fifth largest reservoir in California. The reservoir stores water taken from the San Joaquin-Sacramento River Delta. Water is pumped uphill into the reservoir from the O'Neill Forebay which is fed by the California Aqueduct and is released back into the forebay to continue downstream along the aqueduct as needed for farm irrigation and other uses. Pacheco State Park lies along its western shores.

The San Luis Reservoir is located in Merced County, and has a visitor center located at the Romero Outlook where visitors can learn more about the dam and reservoir. This elevation difference allows for a hydroelectric plant to be constructed - the Gianelli Hydroelectric Plant. Power from this plant is sent to a Path 15 substation, Los Banos via a short power line. Those 500 kV wires, carrying both the power generated here and elsewhere, leave the area and cross the O'Neill Forebay on several man-made islands.

San Justo Dam stores water diverted from San Luis Reservoir through the Pacheco Tunnel and Hollister Conduit, which travel through the Diablo Range. The Santa Clara Tunnel and Santa Clara Conduit convey water to the Coyote Pumping Station in the Santa Clara Valley.

History

San Luis Reservoir State Recreation Area

San Luis Reservoir is part of the larger San Luis Reservoir State Recreation Area (California State Parks) and therefore offers many recreational opportunities for fishermen, boaters, and campers. The park is patrolled by California State Park Peace Officers by vehicle, vessel, and off-highway vehicle. In addition to camping and boating, day use picnic areas are available at San Luis Creek, and an off-highway vehicle (OHV) area is available east of the main area at the intersection of Gonzaga Road and Jaspar-Sears Road.

Camping is available at four campgrounds.

 The Basalt Campground on the south-eastern edge of the lake with 79 developed family campsites.
 San Luis Creek Campground on O'Neill Forebay with 53 sites with water and electric hook-ups.
 Medeiros Campground has primitive campsites along the southern shoreline of O'Neill Forebay. This campground has drinking water at three locations and chemical toilets.
 Los Banos Creek Campground has primitive campsites and limited turn-around space. It is not suitable for trailers or motor homes. Drinking water and chemical toilets are available.

Improved boat launch ramps are offered at Dinosaur Point and the Basalt area. Due to the reservoir's water being imported from the Sacramento River Delta, San Luis shares many of its fish species with that area, including largemouth bass, striped bass, crappie, bluegill, shad, yellow perch, and occasional sturgeon and salmon.
The California Office of Environmental Health Hazard Assessment (OEHHA) has developed a safe eating advisory for fish caught in the San Luis Reservoir based on levels of mercury or PCBs found in local species. The lake is noted for its high winds and has wind warning lights at Romero Outlook, Basalt Campground, and Quien Sabe Point.

Climate

The National Weather Service has maintained a cooperative weather station at San Luis Dam since 1963.

There are an average of 57 days annually with measurable precipitation. Snow rarely falls at the reservoir, but  of snow fell on January 9, 2001.

See also
List of dams and reservoirs in California
List of lakes in California
List of largest reservoirs in the United States
List of largest reservoirs of California

References

Further reading

External links
California State Parks
The Center for Land Use Interpretation
California Dept of Water Resources Daily Reservoir Storage Summary

Gallery

Reservoirs in Merced County, California
California State Recreation Areas
California State Water Project
Diablo Range
Parks in Merced County, California
Central Valley Project
Reservoirs in California
Articles containing video clips
Reservoirs in Northern California